Daniel Jeremiah (born December 5, 1977) is an analyst and writer for the NFL Network and NFL.com. He also serves as a color commentator for Los Angeles Chargers games on KFI radio.

Jeremiah was a starting quarterback at Northeastern Louisiana in 1997 and Appalachian State from 1998 to 2000. He was a college scout with the Baltimore Ravens, Cleveland Browns, and Philadelphia Eagles.

Jeremiah joined the NFL Network in May 2012. While his focus and expertise are on the draft, he appears on the network 2-3 times a week and writes 3 columns a week on NFL.com. He was recently written up by SI's Richard Deitsch as one of the "Twitter 100", the 100 most essential and influential people to follow on Twitter.

Jeremiah joins Matt "Money" Smith to do the broadcasting for the Los Angeles Chargers games.

Jeremiah is married and has 4 children. He is the son of David Jeremiah, the senior pastor of Shadow Mountain Community Church and a nationally known Christian author.

References

External links
 NFL.com bio

1977 births
Living people
American football quarterbacks
Appalachian State Mountaineers football players
Baltimore Ravens scouts
Cleveland Browns scouts
Los Angeles Chargers announcers
Louisiana–Monroe Warhawks football players
National Football League announcers
NFL Network
People from El Cajon, California
Philadelphia Eagles scouts
Players of American football from California